Louis G. Spanos (born March 27, 1971) is an American football coach who was the defensive coordinator for the UConn Huskies football team, a position he held until the start of the 2022 season. He was a defensive quality control and assistant linebackers coach for the Pittsburgh Steelers from 1995–2009, the linebackers coach for the Washington Redskins from 2010–2011, and the defensive coordinator for the UCLA from 2012–2013. He also served as the interim head coach of UConn for much of the 2021 season, following the resignation of long-time head coach Randy Edsall.

Throughout his career, Spanos has been to the Super Bowl three times, winning two of them with the Pittsburgh Steelers in 2006 and 2009, and had been to the College National Championship once; in 2019 with Alabama.

Playing career
Spanos attended Keystone Oaks High School, located in the South Hills suburbs of Pittsburgh, Pennsylvania, and played in the 1989 Big 33 Football Classic. A 1994 graduate of the University of Tulsa, Spanos was a four-year letterman and three-year starter at center. He served as the center for Tulsa quarterback Gus Frerotte.

Coaching career
Spanos stayed at Tulsa for a year after his playing career concluded to assist coaching the linebackers. He joined the Steelers in 1995. Spanos is one of only two assistant coaches to be on the Super Bowl XXX, Super Bowl XL and Super Bowl XLIII coaching staffs, joining defensive line coach John Mitchell. 

On January 16, 2010, Spanos was hired by Mike Shanahan and the Washington Redskins to be their linebackers coach.  After the 2011 season, he left the Redskins to coach the UCLA Bruins defense. On January 18, 2014, Spanos left the Bruins and was hired by Ken Whisenhunt of the Tennessee Titans as linebackers coach.

On September 5, 2021, Huskies head coach Randy Edsall announced plans to retire at the end of the 2021 season; a day later, UConn announced that Edsall would step down immediately as a result of a "mutual decision" between him and the university. Spanos was named the interim head coach for the remainder of the season.

Spanos resigned as defensive coordinator at UConn in August 2022, two weeks before the beginning of the football season.

Head coaching record

Notes

Personal life
Spanos and his wife Timme reside in Mount Pleasant, South Carolina with their two sons, Zachary and Caleb, and daughter Gabriella.

References

External links
 Connecticut profile

1971 births
Living people
Alabama Crimson Tide football coaches
Pittsburgh Steelers coaches
Tennessee Titans coaches
Tulsa Golden Hurricane football players
Tulsa Golden Hurricane football coaches
UCLA Bruins football coaches
Washington Redskins coaches
UConn Huskies football coaches
Coaches of American football from Pennsylvania
Players of American football from Pittsburgh